Noa Tohar Tishby (born May 1975)  is an Israeli actress, writer, producer, and activist. As an actress, she appeared in a variety of American television shows and movies, including The Affair, The Island, Nip/Tuck, Big Love, NCIS, and others. She is also the co-executive producer of the HBO series, In Treatment, which is an adaptation of the Israeli series, BeTipul. Her production company, Noa's Arc, was also responsible for selling several other adaptations of Israeli programs to American networks. 

Tishby also focuses on pro-Israel activism, founding the advocacy organization Act for Israel in 2011. In 2021, she published her first book, Israel: A Simple Guide to the Most Misunderstood Country on Earth. She also serves as Special Envoy for Combating Antisemitism and the Delegitimization of Israel, a position she was appointed to in 2022.

Early life
Noa Tishby was born in Tel Aviv, Israel, in May 1977, into a Zionist family involved in the establishment of Israel. The kibbutz her grandfather co-founded was among the first in Israel's history. Tishby began acting at an early age, appearing in commercials by age 8. As a teenager, she earned a drama scholarship from the Tel Aviv Museum of Art and acted in several stage productions and television shows. She also served two and a half years in the Israel Defense Forces.

Career
Tishby began to achieve fame in Israel in the 1990s, appearing on the Israeli television drama, Ramat Aviv Gimmel and starring as Anita in a production of West Side Story at the Habima Theatre. She also released an English language album (Nona) and appeared on magazine covers and billboard ads as a model. In the early 2000s, she moved to Los Angeles.

By 2006, Tishby had appeared in a series of television roles on shows like Star Trek, Nip/Tuck, CSI: Crime Scene Investigation, The 4400, and Charmed. She also had a part in the 2005 film, The Island. In 2008, Tishby sold the Israeli drama series, BeTipul, to HBO. It was the first Israeli format to become an American television show. The resultant American adaptation, In Treatment, premiered in 2008 with Tishby as co-executive producer along with Mark Wahlberg. 

It ran for three seasons between 2008 and 2010, before returning for a fourth season in 2021 with Tishby still as co-executive producer. The show, which follows a series of fictional therapy sessions, won a Peabody Award in 2009. In the years during and after In Treatments first run, Tishby continued to play roles on TV shows like NCIS and Big Love.

Additionally, Tishby began pitching adaptations of other Israeli programs to American networks through her production company, Noa's Arc. Tishby was responsible for the development of adaptations for A Touch Away, as well as Life Isn't Everything, which was renamed Divorce: A Love Story for the American version. 

In April 2021, she released her first book, Israel: A Simple Guide to the Most Misunderstood Country on Earth. The book discusses the history and culture of Israel with autobiographical details. In the book, Tishby takes a pro-Israel stance and criticizes the Boycott, Divestment and Sanctions (BDS) movement as it pertains to the Israeli–Palestinian conflict. The book was published by Simon & Schuster.

Activism

Tishby has been an activist advocating for Israel since at least 2011. That year she founded Act for Israel, an online pro-Israel advocacy organization. Tishby created the group to help correct misinformation about Israel's history, culture, and governmental policies. Specifically, Tishby has harshly criticized the BDS movement, referring to the principles behind its cause as "misinformation, disinformation, manipulation, elimination of history and flat-out lies." She has also called Amnesty International's characterization of Israel as an apartheid state to be "disgraceful".

In 2014, she founded Reality Israel, which holds a series of "leadership trips" for Jewish and non-Jewish people in Israel. In 2016 and 2018, she spoke before the United Nations General Assembly in New York City in support of Israel. In February 2021, Tishby joined the Black–Jewish Entertainment Alliance. 

In April 2022, Tishby was appointed by Yair Lapid as Special Envoy for Combating Antisemitism and the Delegitimization of Israel, the first person to serve in the newly appointed position.

Personal life
Tishby has one son and was previously married to Australian television presenter Osher Günsberg from 2008 to 2011.

Filmography

As actress

Film

Television

As producer

References

External links
 
 

1977 births
Living people
21st-century Israeli women singers
Jewish military personnel
Israeli emigrants to the United States
Israeli female military personnel
Israeli female models
Israeli film actresses
Jewish Israeli singers
Jewish women singers
Israeli television actresses
Israeli television producers
Israeli women television presenters
Jewish female models
Jewish Israeli actresses
Women television producers
Jewish women activists
Anti-BDS activists
21st-century Israeli women writers
Jewish women writers